Aruba Networks, formerly known as Aruba Wireless Networks, is a Santa Clara, California-based cloud based security networking subsidiary of Hewlett Packard Enterprise company.

The company was founded in Sunnyvale, California in 2002 by Keerti Melkote and Pankaj Manglik. On March 2, 2015, Hewlett-Packard announced it would acquire Aruba Networks for approximately $3 billion USD. On May 19, 2015, HP completed the acquisition. As of November 1, 2015, the company operates as the "Intelligent Edge" business unit of Hewlett Packard Enterprise company, which encompasses all of HP/HPE's networking and security related operations and acquisitions.

Acquisitions

See also
 HP Networking Products
 ProCurve
 ProCurve Products

References

External links
 
 Aruba Instant On
 HPE Networking

Networking companies of the United States
Networking hardware companies
Companies based in Santa Clara, California
Computer companies established in 2002
American companies established in 2002
Technology companies based in the San Francisco Bay Area
Manufacturing companies based in the San Francisco Bay Area
2002 establishments in California
Companies formerly listed on the Nasdaq
2007 initial public offerings
Hewlett-Packard acquisitions
Hewlett-Packard Enterprise acquisitions
2015 mergers and acquisitions
Defunct computer companies of the United States
Defunct computer hardware companies